Louis Dupré (1697–1774) was a French ballet dancer, ballet master and ballet teacher.

Life
Probably first dancing in child roles under the name "Petit Dupré", he made his official débuts at the Royal Academy of Music in 1714 and became its balletmaster in 1739. From 1725 to 1730, he regularly put on productions in London, Dresden and at the Polish court.  Until 1743 he was one of the principal professors at the dance school of the National Opera of Paris, where his students included Marie-Anne de Camargo, Gaétan Vestris, Jean-Georges Noverre, Maximilien Gardel and Jean-Baptiste Hus.

Casanova was one of his devoted admirers.  Technically accomplished, he was an emblematic figure of French belle danse, and in his time he was called "le Grand Dupré" and "god of the dance".

Collège Louis le Grand
He composed several ballets for the students of the Collège Louis le Grand:
 1748 : Portrait du Grand Monarque
 1749 : Catilina
 1750 : Le Temple de la fortune
 1751 : Le Génie
 1754 : Les Spectacles du Parnasse
 1755 : La Prospérité

1690 births
1774 deaths
18th-century French ballet dancers
French ballet masters
French male ballet dancers
Ballet choreographers
Dupre
French choreographers
20th-century ballet dancers